Magic truffles are the sclerotia of psilocybin mushrooms that are not technically the same as "mushrooms". They are masses of mycelium that contain the fruiting body which contains the hallucinogenic chemicals psilocybin and psilocin.

In October 2007, the prohibition of hallucinogenic or "magic mushrooms" was announced by the Dutch authorities. The ban on mushrooms did not outlaw the hallucinogenic species in sclerotium form, due to authorities believing it to be weaker than the mushrooms. Psilocybin truffles which once made little sales became the only legal option to produce. Today, smart shops in the Netherlands offer magic truffles as a legal alternative to the outlawed mushrooms.

Addiction 
Physical addiction to magic truffles has never been documented, however psychological addiction is possible. There is cross tolerance between psilocybin and LSD, meaning that a higher dose of these substances is needed to get the same effect when a person consumes them with high frequency. Through (temporary) abstinence the tolerance returns to baseline without any withdrawal symptoms.

Species 
There are three different types of truffles: Psilocybe mexicana (Jalisco/Mexicana A), Psilocybe tampanensis and Psilocybe galindoi.

See also 
 Drug policy of the Netherlands
 Mushroom tea

References 

Drug culture
Psychoactive fungi